Md Rashedul Islam (born 1 September 1990) is a former Bangladeshi footballer and sports journalist, who is currently serving as the team manager of Bangladesh Premier League club Fortis FC. A player of wide range, he used to play as a right back in his playing career. 

He was part of Bangladesh national team in 2010 AFC Challenge Cup qualification, when he won his only cap for the national team. He represented Bangladesh in 2006 AFC U-17 Championship too. 

After his early retire from football, Rashedul started his career with Prothom Alo as a sports journalist. In 2022, he ended his seven-years long journalism career to join newly promoted top tier club Fortis FC.

International career
In 2006, Rashedul Islam played for Bangladesh under-17 team in 2006 AFC U-17 Championship held in Singapore.

On 30 April 2009, Rashedul made his senior team debut in a 3-0 win against Macau in 2010 AFC Challenge Cup qualification under Brazillian coach Dido.

References

Living people
1990 births
Bangladeshi footballers
Association football fullbacks
Bangladesh youth international footballers
Bangladesh international footballers
Bangladesh Football Premier League players
Muktijoddha Sangsad KC players
Brothers Union players
Feni SC players
Bangladeshi journalists
Bangladeshi newspaper editors